Nerita yoldii is a species of sea snail, a marine gastropod mollusk in the family Neritidae.

Description

Distribution

References

 Récluz, C. 1841. Description de quelques nouvelles espèces de Nérites vivantes (Suite). Revue Zoologique 4: 147–152

Neritidae
Gastropods described in 1841